The Oxford and Cambridge Catholic Education Board (OCCEB) is the charitable body responsible for appointing the Catholic chaplains to the universities of Oxford and Cambridge.

OCCEB was established by the Vatican in 1895 as the Universities Catholic Education Board in response to the Universities Tests Act 1871. The current chairman is the Right Reverend John Arnold.

References 

Religious organizations established in 1895
Educational institutions established in 1895
Catholic Church in England and Wales
Catholic Church in Cambridge
Christianity in Oxford
Christianity in Cambridge
Organisations associated with the University of Cambridge
Organisations associated with the University of Oxford
Oxbridge
Charities based in England
1895 establishments in England